The My Cloud is a line of personal network-attached storage devices and multi-purpose servers designed and marketed by Western Digital Corporation (WD). My Cloud devices come in sizes of 2 terabytes, 3 terabytes, 4 terabytes, and 8 terabytes. A second model of My Cloud may have up to 16 terabytes.

Hardware

My Cloud uses a Mindspeed Comcerto 2000 dual-core ARM Cortex-A9 Communication processor running at 650 MHz. The gigabit Ethernet port is a Broadcom BCM54612E Gigabit Ethernet transceiver. Other components include 256 megabytes of Samsung K4B2G1646E DDR3 random access memory and 512 kilobytes of Winbound 25X40CL flash memory. The drive used is a WD Red 2 terabyte hard drive.

My Cloud relies on fanless air convection for cooling.

My Cloud OS

My Cloud comes pre-installed with the My Cloud OS (operating system). However, it is possible to overwrite it with a custom, third-party operating system.

This operating system is proprietary, with a user-friendly graphical user interface. However, others have found the operating system to be Linux, with a graphical user interface, but also SSH accessible. which comes pre-installed on all My Cloud devices.

Compatibility

My Cloud apps

My Cloud is compatible with personal computers, Apple Macs, Android devices, and iOS devices, via an application provided by Western Digital.

References

Network-attached storage